Geophilus labrofissus is a species of soil centipede in the family Geophilidae found on the Balkan Peninsula. It's a poorly defined species of uncertain identity that was first described in Zoologische Jahrbücher. Abteilung für Systematik, Ökologie und Geographie der Tiere. This species has 59 pairs of legs.

References 

labrofissus
Animals described in 1951
Myriapods of Europe
Taxa named by Karl Wilhelm Verhoeff